Abdoulie Paco Corr (born 9 June 1982) is a Gambian footballer who has played for Banjul Hawks, KPV, PoPa, VPS and Närpes Kraft. He has been capped at international level by the Gambia national team.

References

1982 births
Living people
Sportspeople from Banjul
Gambian footballers
Association football defenders
Veikkausliiga players
Vaasan Palloseura players
Kokkolan Palloveikot players
Närpes Kraft Fotbollsförening players
The Gambia international footballers
Gambian expatriate footballers
Expatriate footballers in Finland
Serer sportspeople